Nathan "Karma" Cox is a music video director.

Filmography

2017
"Poontang Boomerang" - Steel Panther
"Be With Me" - Old Dominion

2016
"Stick to Your Guns" - Sick Puppies
"Destroy Something Beautiful" - Media Solution

2015
"Tonight We Ride" - Unleash the Archers

2014
"Would You Still Be There" - Of Mice & Men
"You Can't Stop Me" - Suicide Silence
"Same Damn Life" - Seether

2012
"I Came to Party" - Deuce

2011
"The Last Time" - All That Remains
"Fallen Angels" - Black Veil Brides
"You Only Live Once" - Suicide Silence
"Let's Get It Crackin'" - Deuce
"America" - Deuce

2010
 "Gods and Punks" - Monster Magnet
 "Let the Guilt Go" - Korn
 "My Soul Still Burns" - Media Solution

2009
 "Running to the Edge of the World" - Marilyn Manson
 "No Surprise" - Daughtry
 "Jars" - Chevelle

2008
 "Inside the Fire" - Disturbed
 "Runnin' Wild" - Airbourne

2007
 "Not All Who Wander Are Lost" - DevilDriver
 "The Running Free" - Coheed and Cambria

2006
 "Our Truth" - Lacuna Coil
 "Kill to Believe" - Bleeding Through
 "Killing Loneliness" - HIM
 "Anthem (We Are the Fire)" - Trivium
 "Enjoy the Silence" - Lacuna Coil
 "Closer" - Lacuna Coil
 "Drownin" - Shurman
 "The River" - Live

2005
 "Little Sister" - Queens of the Stone Age
 "The Clincher" - Chevelle
 "Drive Away" - Gratitude
 "Personal Jesus" - Marilyn Manson
 "Liberate" - Disturbed
 "Alone (No More)" - Craving Theo
 "Right Here" - Staind
 "Stricken" - Disturbed

2004
 "Vitamin R (Leading Us Along)" - Chevelle
 "Redefine" - SOiL
 "Looks Like They Were Right" - Lit
 "Guilty" - The Rasmus

2003
 "Good Times" - Finger Eleven
 "Out of Control" - Hoobastank
 "Something Beautiful" - Cauterize

2002
 "I Feel So" - Box Car Racer (co-directed with Tom DeLonge)
 "Cold" - Static-X (co-directed with Mr. Hahn)
 "The Red" - Chevelle
 "Pitiful" - Blindside
 "Dem Girlz" - Oxide & Neutrino

2001
 "Angel's Son" - Various Artists (including members of Snot, Korn, Sevendust, Slipknot, System of a Down, Coal Chamber, Limp Bizkit and Sugar Ray)
 "Papercut" - Linkin Park (co-directed with Joe "Mr. Hahn" Hahn)
 "In the End" - Linkin Park (also co-directed with Mr. Hahn)
 "Points of Authority" - Linkin Park
 "Crashing Around You" - Machine Head
 "Moto Psycho" - Megadeth
 "Down with the Sickness" - Disturbed

2000
 "Ty Jonathan Down" - Videodrone featuring Jonathan Davis
 "Synthetic" - Spineshank
 "Satisfied" - 8stops7
 "Stupify" - Disturbed
 "What's the Dillio?" - Mest

1998
 "War?" - System of a Down
 "Sugar" - System of a Down

1997
 "Loco" - Coal Chamber

DVDs
 "Music as a Weapon II" - Disturbed, Ünloco, Taproot and Chevelle
 "M.O.L." - Disturbed
 "Deuce" - Korn
 "Who Then Now?" - Korn
 "Frat Party at the Pankake Festival" - Linkin Park

Awards
Cox has been nominated for 11 awards and won 1 award for his music video work.

Wins include:
MTV Video Music Awards
Best Rock Video - Linkin Park: “In the End” (winner)

Nominations include:
MTV Video Music Awards
Best Editing - Metallica: “I Disappear” (nominated)
Best Group Video - Linkin Park: “In the End” (nominated)
Video of The Year - Linkin Park: “In the End” (nominated)
Best Editing - Foo Fighters: “Best of You” (nominated)

Music Video Producers Association Awards:
Directorial Debut - Coal Chamber: “Loco" (nominated)
Best Editing - Foo Fighters: “Best of You” (nominated)
Best Editing - The Fray: “How to Save a Life” (nominated)

Billboard Music Video Awards:
Best Hard Rock Video - System of a Down: “Sugar” (nominated)
Best Hard Rock Video - Disturbed: “Stupify” (nominated)

Much Music Video Awards:
Best Rock Video - Finger Eleven: "Good Times" (nominated)

References

1971 births
American music video directors
Living people